Metatrichia is a genus of window flies in the family Scenopinidae.

Species

Metatrichia asiatica Krivosheina & Krivosheina, 1999
Metatrichia barbata Ale-Rocha & Limeira-de-Oliveira, 2021
Metatrichia bilituna Kelsey, 1981
Metatrichia brunnipennis Ale-Rocha & Limeira-de-Oliveira, 2021
Metatrichia bulbosa (Osten Sacken, 1877)
Metatrichia clausa (Loew, 1873)
Metatrichia deserticola Krivosheina & Krivosheina, 1999
Metatrichia freidbergi Krivosheina & Krivosheina, 1999
Metatrichia griseola (Coquillett, 1900)
Metatrichia lophyrosoma (Speiser, 1920)
Metatrichia mongolica Kelsey, 1981
Metatrichia nigeriana Kelsey, 1984
Metatrichia palaestinensis (Kröber, 1937)
Metatrichia papuana Kelsey, 1970
Metatrichia pria Yeates & Grimaldi, 1993
Metatrichia robusta Kröber, 1913
Metatrichia stevensoni (Bezzi, 1925)
Metatrichia thailandica Kelsey, 1970

References

Brachycera genera
Scenopinidae
Taxa named by Daniel William Coquillett
Diptera of North America
Diptera of South America
Diptera of Asia
Diptera of Africa
Diptera of Australasia